The eighty-seventh Connecticut House of Representatives district elects one member of the Connecticut House of Representatives. Its current representative is Dave Yaccarino. The district consists of the town of North Haven.

List of representatives

Recent elections

External links 
 Google Maps - Connecticut House Districts

References

87